Vriesea barilletii is a plant species in the genus Vriesea. It is endemic to the State of Espírito Santo in eastern Brazil and widely cultivated elsewhere as an ornamental.

Cultivars 
 Vriesea 'Brachystachys Major'
 Vriesea 'Closoniana'
 Vriesea 'Closoniana-Brachystachys-Major'
 Vriesea 'Donneaina'
 Vriesea 'Fire Rose'
 Vriesea 'Flamme'
 Vriesea 'Gloriosa'
 Vriesea 'Gravisiana'
 Vriesea 'Insignis H.L.B.'
 Vriesea 'Inspektor Perring'
 Vriesea 'Kitteliana'
 Vriesea 'Leodiensis'
 Vriesea 'Magnisiana'
 Vriesea 'Magnusiana'
 Vriesea 'Mariae'
 Vriesea 'Morreno-Barilletii'
 Vriesea 'Petersiana'
 Vriesea 'President Oscar Lamarche'
 Vriesea 'Psittacina-Picta'
 Vriesea 'Purple Cockatoo'
 Vriesea 'Ubanteniana'
 Vriesea 'Wanteniana'
 Vriesea 'Weyringeriana'
 Vriesea 'Wiotiana'
 Vriesea 'Wittmackiana'

References

barilletii
Endemic flora of Brazil
Epiphytes
Plants described in 1883